Bharatpur is one of the 200 Legislative Assembly constituencies of Rajasthan state in India. It is in Bharatpur district and in Bharatpur Lok Sabha Constituency.

Member of Legislative Assembly

Election results

2018

See also
List of constituencies of the Rajasthan Legislative Assembly
Bharatpur district

References

Bharatpur district
Assembly constituencies of Rajasthan